Lake Florence is a tear-shaped natural freshwater lake in east-central Winter Haven, Florida. This lake has a  surface area. It is surrounded on all but its east and northeast sides by residential areas. On the east it is bordered by woods and on the northeast it is bordered by a citrus grove.

There is no public access to the shore of Lake Florence, so it has no public swimming areas or boat ramps. The Hook and Bullet website, however, says the lake contains largemouth bass, bluegill and crappie.

References

Florence